The 2013–14 season was FC Dinamo București's 65th consecutive season in Liga I. In this season, Dinamo played in Liga I and Cupa României. Dinamo finished the previous season on the 6th place in Liga I and missed a qualification for a European competition for the first time since 1998.

Thus, the club changed its technical staff, Gheorghe Mulțescu replacing Cornel Ţălnar as head-coach, and made several changes in the squad. The goalscorer from the previous season, Marius Alexe, was loaned in Serie A, at Sassuolo Calcio. After a poor start of the season, Mulțescu was sacked in September and Flavius Stoican was promoted from the second team of the club.

Dinamo ended the season on the fourth spot, a position that guaranteed the qualification for the Europa League, but after the club announced to open the insolvency procedure, the Romanian Federation withdrew the rights to play in the European competition.

Review

Pre-season
Dinamo started its preparations for the new season on 17 June. 33 players were present for the first training session. Some of them were promoted from the second team and others were bought for tests with Dinamo. Between 22 and 29 June, Dinamo had a mountain preparation, at Poiana Brașov. The squad was formed by 27 players, eight of them being brought during this summer. The mountain training ended with a test-game, against newly promoted in Liga I Corona Brașov. Dinamo lost the game 1–0.

From 1 July until 13 July, Dinamo moved to England, in the Leeds area, for a training camp during which, the team played a large number of friendly games. Some of its opponents were Oldham Athletic AFC and Heart of Midlothian FC.

Season

July
Dinamo started the season away at the newly promoted ACS Poli Timișoara. Poli won the game 2–0.

The first home game in this season was played on National Arena. On 28 July, Dinamo defeated FC Vaslui 2–0. Dorin Rotariu scored his first goal in Liga I, the day before his 18th birthday.

August
In the third round of the championship, on 5 August, Dinamo met Viitorul Constanţa, and failed again to win against the team owned by Gheorghe Hagi. The game played in Chiajna ended 0-0. In three direct games, Dinamo never beat Viitorul.

The first episode of the season from the Eternal derby was played on 11 August. Dinamo was considered the host, the game being played at Arena Națională. Steaua started perfectly, with a goal scored in the fifth minute, by Iasmin Latovlevici. Collins Fai scored an own goal in the 38th minute, trying to send the ball back to his own keeper who didn't understand the decision of his colleague. In the second half, Dorin Rotariu scored his second goal of the season, but Steaua won 2–1.

Dinamo could not find the way to a win neither in the next game, against newly promoted Corona Braşov, a team without a point after four matches. Elton opened the score with his first goal for Dinamo, but the home side equalised before half time and despite a few chances missed by Cosmin Matei in the second half, the score remained 1-1. With only five points in five games, this was the worst start of a season for Dinamo since 2004.

The following round, Dinamo defeated U.Cluj, recording the biggest win of the season in Liga I, 6–0. Dinamo hadn't won by such margins for eight years, since a game against FCM Bacău played in September 2005. Dragoș Grigore scored twice in his 100th game for Dinamo in Liga I.

September
After three weeks without games, due to the national team's matches, Dinamo travelled on 13 September to Târgu Jiu, to meet Pandurii. Dinamo started well, opened the score after a goal by Cosmin Matei, and had other chances to double its advantage, but a red card seen by Constantin Grecu forced Dinamo to take a step back, and Pandurii managed to score twice in the final 15 minutes and won 2–1.

The following round, Dinamo met Petrolul Ploiești at Arena Națională. Dinamo opened the score through Alexandru Curtean but then tried to defend the advantage and Petrolul dominated the game. Cristian Bălgrădean was the hero for Dinamo, saving a penalty, in the 53rd minute, and other big chances missed by Petrolul. But in the 89th minute, the defence could not stop Juan Albin who scored the equalising goal, and the game ended in a draw.

After the draw against Petrolul, Gheorghe Mulțescu was sacked, the owner reproaching the poor results, Dinamo managing to win only two games from the first eight played.

The same day when Mulțescu was sacked, his place was taken by Flavius Stoican, head coach from the second Dinamo team.

Stoican started his spell with a win, against Sănătatea Cluj in Cupa României. In this game, Kevin Zougoula made his debut for Dinamo, with a brace.

In the first championship game with Stoican as manager, Dinamo came from behind at Galați, against Oțelul, and won 2–1 with goals scored by Dragoș Grigore and Dorin Rotariu.

October
Dinamo faced Ceahlăul Piatra Neamț at home and took an early lead, after Steven Thicot's first goal for the Bucharest squad. But Bojan Golubovic equalised three minutes before half time and the match ended in a draw. This were the first points lost since Stoican was instated as head coach. The first defeat under Stoican's spell came in the next round, away, against Astra Giurgiu. Astra led 2–0, Dinamo managed to score once in the final minute of the first half, but without a goal after the break, Dinamo suffered the fourth defeat of the season.

On 28 October, George Ţucudean became the first striker who scored a goal for Dinamo in this Liga I season. Ţucudean opened the score in the game against Concordia Chiajna, game won by Dinamo, 2–1. No other striker managed to score in the first 11 games of the season.

On the last day of October, Dinamo qualified to the Romanian Cup quarter-finals. Dinamo won 5–0 against Chindia Târgoviște from Liga III. Joël Thomas, Alexandre Durimel and Valentin Lazăr scored their first goals for Dinamo in this game.

November
The first game of November was played at home where Dinamo met FC Brașov. Dinamo led 2–0, Thicot scoring in the last minute of the first half and Lazăr doubled the score in the second half. Brașov managed to score once, after a penalty, but Dinamo won 2-1 and reached the third win in a row, in all competitions.

Dinamo failed to register the third win in a row in the championship, losing the following round, away at CFR Cluj. Florin Costea scored the only goal of the game. Dinamo played for over an hour with an extra player after CFR'Ionuț Rada was sent off in the 31st minute, but could not scored. Since Ionuţ Negoiță took over the club, Dinamo never managed to win three games in a row in Liga I.

On 12 November, Ionel Dănciulescu ended his career as a footballer and became team-manager at Dinamo. Dănciulescu played 356 games for Dinamo in Liga I, scoring 152 goals. He became champion of Romania three times with Dinamo and won the Romanian Cup four times.

On 24 November, when the head coach Flavius Stoican celebrated his 37th birthday, Dinamo won the game against Gaz Metan Mediaș. George Țucudean scored the only goal of the game. The next round, Dinamo won with the same score, 1–0, at Săgeata Năvodari. It was only the second win away from home.

December
On 4 December, Dinamo qualified for the semifinals of the Romanian Cup. Dinamo won 1–0 against Pandurii, with a goal scored by Dragoș Grigore. After this game, Cosmin Matei lost the captaincy of the team. Matei was replaced in the 70th minute and had a nervous reaction to the decision, thus the head coach, Stoican, decided to take Matei's armband and gave it to Dragoș Grigore.

The fourth win in a row with the same score, 1–0, came in the following championship game, against FC Botoșani. Țucudean scored the only goal of the meeting.

The last home game for 2013 came against ACS Poli Timișoara. Dinamo defeated Poli 4–0, Dorin Rotariu managing to score once and assist the other three goals.

On 17 December, Dinamo drew away against FC Vaslui. The home team scored through a penalty transformed by Liviu Antal, but George Țucudean equalised in the second half. Thus, Dinamo finished the year on the 5th position.

January
When the winter transfer period started, Dinamo bought Polish player Kamil Biliński, but decided to sell two players from the first team, Srdjan Luchin and Alexandru Curtean. The two were sold to Botev Plovdiv for one million euros, according to the Romanian press.

February
The spring season started badly for Dinamo who failed to beat at home Viitorul Constanța. Dinamo led after a goal scored by Țucudean in the sixth minute, but Viitorul scored twice in the last 10 minute. First, Ionuț Cioinac, who made his debut for Dinamo, scored an own goal, then he brought down an opponent in the box and Larie put Viitorul ahead from the penalty spot.

March
The month of March started with the eternal derby. On 1 March, Dinamo played at Steaua and led after a goal scored by Dragoș Grigore from a penalty in the 58th minute. Steaua equalized late, in the 89th minute, and thus the game ended with a draw.

The first official win of 2014 came on 10 March, in a game against Corona Brașov. Valentin Lazăr scored the only goal of the game and Dinamo climbed to the fourth position in Liga I for the first time this season. The following week, Dinamo won at Universitatea Cluj, only the third win away this season. Cosmin Matei scored the only goal of the game.

The third home loss was registered on 22 March, against Pandurii Tg.Jiu. Kamil Bilinski scored twice for Dinamo, his first goals since he was transferred from Žalgiris Vilnius, but Pandurii won in the end 3–2.

On 27 March, Dinamo were outwitted and outclassed as they were heavily beaten by their biggest rivals, Steaua, 5–2, in the first leg of the Romanian Cup semifinals.

The third game in a row without a win came in Ploiești, against Petrolul. The team managed by Răzvan Lucescu led twice, but Dinamo managed to equalise every time. Ştefan Bărboianu scored the first goal for Dinamo, then an own goal in second half from Guilherme settled the final score: 2-2. After this game, Dinamo descended a place in the Liga I standings, ending the month of March on the fifth position.

April
Dinamo moved back to the fourth spot in the championship after a 3–1 win against Oțelul Galați. Grigore and Rotariu scored again, the two remaining on the top positions regarding the goalscorers of the season for Dinamo.

1-0 became the favourite result for Flavius Stoican. The sixth win with this score came against Ceahlaul. The only goal was scored by Cosmin Matei.

In the Romanian Cup, Dinamo failed to qualify for the final. In the second leg of the semifinals, Dinamo couldn't revert the score against Steaua. The game ended 1-1 and Steaua qualified for the final with a 6–3 win on aggregate.

The third win in a row in the championship came against Astra Giurgiu. Ionuț Șerban scored his first goal for Dinamo, and Dorin Rotariu found the net for the seventh time this season, bringing a 2–0 win for Dinamo who remained fourth in the standings.

The good round of results continued, Dinamo managing to win for the fourth consecutive time in the championship. A 3–1 win against Concordia Chiajna moved Dinamo closer to its objective, the return to the Europa League.

May
The winning streak ended abruptly when Dinamo lost against a side that fights against relegation, FC Brașov. Despite the loss, Dinamo kept the fourth spot of the standings. It was the first away loss after six months, since the defeat suffered against CFR Cluj, at the beginning of November.

The second loss in a row came at home, against CFR Cluj. Dinamo failed to defeat on the own stadium against CFR for the fifth consecutive season, the Railwaymen winning four games and drawing the fifth.

Another winless game, the third in a row, was registered away from home, against Gaz Metan. Dinamo led 1–0, missed a penalty through Dragos Grigore, and was equalised in the dying seconds.

The first win after three winless games came against Săgeata Năvodari. Dinamo scored four times and Valentin Lazăr shone with his first brace for the club. With this win, Dinamo secured the fourth spot and consequently the place for the Europa League.

The last game of the season was played in Botoșani. The home team opened the score after a penalty given for handball by Adrian Popa. Bilinski equalised before half time. In the second half, Dinamo earned a penalty after a foul by Stojkov against Bărboianu, but Lazăr missed. Finally, Bilinski scored his second goal in this game and Dinamo won 2–1. Despite finishing fourth, Dinamo haven't qualify for Europa League after the decision from the Romanian Federation to withdraw the club's licence because of the insolvency procedures.

Players

Squad changes

Transfers in:

Transfers out:

Loans in:

Loans out:

Squad statistics

Statistics accurate as of match played 21 May 2014

Disciplinary record
Includes all competitive matches.

Last updated on 21 May 2014

Competitions

Overall
FC Dinamo played in two competitions: Liga I and Cupa României.

Liga I

Standings

Results summary

Results by round

Competitive

Liga I
Kickoff times are in EET.

Cupa României

Non competitive matches

References

2013-14
Romanian football clubs 2013–14 season